Raven Quinn is an American musician, singer and songwriter. Her first self-titled album was released March 4, 2010. Quinn released the title track "Not In Vain" from her sophomore album on October 31, 2013, with the full second album Not In Vain seeing release on October 6, 2014.  On December 8, 2015, Raven Quinn released The Acoustic EP, containing acoustic versions of songs from her first two albums.

Career
Raven Quinn released her first solo album Raven Quinn through Corvus Entertainment on March 4, 2010.  The album was produced with Dan Brodbeck.  Within hours of release it became a number one on Amazon's "Movers and Shakers"  charts and held top 100 chart positions in Amazon.com's Rock and MP3 album charts within the first twelve hours of release.

In December 2012, Quinn released a digital EP entitled Demos & Rarities Part I  a collection of demo recordings and previously unreleased tracks which were recorded during the making of her debut album. In October 2013, Quinn released the title track "Not In Vain" from her second album.

October 6, 2014 Quinn's sophomore effort Not In Vain was released. Pairing up again with producer Dan Brodbeck, Not In Vain joined her 2010 self-titled release in the top of the Amazon.com's Movers and Shakers, Rock, and Pop sales charts.

in 2015, Quinn's acoustic EP, a compilation of acoustic tracks from her first two albums, was released on December 8 with proceeds benefiting the Cancer Research Collaboration, an organization formed by Breastlink, where Quinn was treated for invasive ductal carcinoma.

Raven Quinn – all vocals
George Lynch – guitars
Josh Freese – drums
Blair Sinta – drums
Aaron Embry – piano and pads
Dan Brodbeck – guitars, bass and keyboards

Discography
Album:
Raven Quinn (2010)
Demos & Rarities Part I (2012)
Not in Vain (2014)
The Acoustic EP (2015)
Singles:
Not in Vain (2013)
Other appearances:
The Window (Rock Band song)
Decadence (Rock Band song)
Catalyst (Rock Band song)

References

External links
Official Website
USA TODAY Article
Hits Daily Double (Music Industry Trade)
Hits Daily Double (Music Industry Trade)
MTV Artist page
Last fm information
Raven Quinn songs on Rock Band

Women rock singers
American rock musicians
Living people
21st-century American women singers
21st-century American singers
Year of birth missing (living people)